Wormald Green railway station served the village of Wormald Green, Harrogate, England from 1848 to 1964 on the Leeds-Northallerton Railway.

History 
The station was opened on 1 June 1848 by the Leeds Northern Railway. The station was situated on the south side of the Wormald Green - Markington Road, just west of its junction with Ripon Road on the A61. There were four sidings, two of which served a coal depot. Pepper's Lime quarry had a private siding. There were more sidings to the north serving Monkton Moor quarries. In 1911, the main freight handled at the station was barley (155 tons) and 128 wagons of livestock. After closure to passengers on 18 June 1962, the station was still open to goods traffic but it was downgraded to an unstaffed public delivery siding until its complete closure on 31 August 1964.

References

External links 

Former North Eastern Railway (UK) stations
Railway stations in Great Britain opened in 1848
Railway stations in Great Britain closed in 1962
1848 establishments in England
1964 disestablishments in England